Rostamabad-e Shomali Rural District is a rural district (dehestan) in the Central District of Rudbar County, Gilan Province, Iran. At the 2006 census, its population was 2,782, in 757 families. The rural district has 13 villages.

References 

Rural Districts of Gilan Province
Rudbar County
Settled areas of Elburz